Beaumé is a commune in the department of Aisne in the Hauts-de-France region of northern France.

Geography
Beaumé is located some 70 km east of Saint-Quentin and 50 km west of Charleville-Mézières. It can be accessed by the D37 road from Besmont in the west passing through the commune and the village and continuing east to Aubenton. There are also several other country roads accessing the commune from all directions. Apart from the village there are two other hamlets: La Courte Soupe and Monplaisir. The south of the commune is heavily forested however most of the commune is farmland.

The Ruisseau de l'Etang Polliart flows from the southeast of the commune to the north with several tributaries as it continues north out of the commune to join the Ton river at Leuze.

Neighbouring communes and villages

Administration

List of Successive Mayors of Beaumé

Population

Culture and heritage

Civil heritage
The commune has a number of buildings and structures that are registered as historical monuments:
A Farmhouse at 6 Rue de l'Eglise (1849)
A Farmhouse at La Courte Soupe d'en bas (18th century)
An old Chateau at 4-12 Rue de Leuze (1772)
The Town Hall / School at 2 Place de la Mairie (1843)
The old Grange-aux-Bois Manor at Grange-aux-Bois (1870)

Religious heritage

The commune has several religious buildings and structures that are registered as historical monuments:
The Bordreaux-Grimpret Family Tomb (1882)
The Tomb of Hippolite Licent (1858)
The Tomb of Infantry Captain Pierre Antoine Menu (1844)
The Parish Church and Cemetery of Saint Nicolas (14th century)

The Church contains many items that are registered as historical objects:

A Paten (19th century)
A Book: Missale Ecclesiae Laudensis (1773)
A Chalice (19th century)
A Stoup (18th century)
A Stained glass window: Our Lady of Victories (19th century)
The Charlotte Bell (1783)
An Altar Painting: Christ on the Cross (1969)
A Baptismal font (16th century)
The "Queen's Chair" (18th century)
A Statue: Saint Nicolas (16th century)
A set of 4 Church Lamps (19th century)
A Wardrobe converted to a Confessional (19th century)
The Furniture in the Church
The Furniture in the Church (Supplementary list)
A Book: Book of Common Prayer and particular Masses of Saint Benedict (1619)
A set of 5 Pews (17th century)
The Panelling in the semi-recess of the Choir (18th century)
The Retable on the main Altar (18th century)
The Tabernacle on the main Altar (18th century)
The main Altar (18th century)
The whole of the decoration of the Choir (17th century)
A Stool for a Choir child (18th century)
A Bronze Bell (1783)

Notable People linked to the commune

Pierre Antoine Menu, Captain of the 84th regiment of infantry of the line, Chevalier of the Legion of Honour, native of Archon. Buried at Beaumé.

See also
Communes of the Aisne department

References

External links
Beaumé on the old National Geographic Institute website 
Files of the Cultural Heritage Inventory of Beaumé 
Beaumé on Géoportail, National Geographic Institute (IGN) website 
Beaumée on the 1750 Cassini Map

Communes of Aisne